Until 1 December 2005, Perm Oblast was a federal subject of Russia (an oblast) in Privolzhsky (Volga) Federal District. According to the results of the referendum held in October 2004, Perm Oblast was merged with Komi-Permyak Autonomous Okrug to form Perm Krai.

It was established in 1938 as part of the RSFSR. From 1940 to 1957 it was named Molotov Oblast in honor of Vyacheslav Molotov. The oblast was named after its administrative center, the city of Perm. The oblast covered an area of 160,600 km², and as of the 2002 Census its population was 2,819,421. Before the merger, neighboring oblasts and republics were (from north clockwise) Komi Republic, Sverdlovsk Oblast, Republic of Bashkortostan, Udmurt Republic, and Kirov Oblast.

Geography

Time zone
Perm Oblast was located in the Yekaterinburg Time Zone (YEKT/YEKST).  UTC offset is +0500 (YEKT)/+0600 (YEKST).

Administrative divisions

External links
 
 Perm regional server

Former federal subjects of Russia
Perm Krai
 States and territories established in 1938